Unshō (運敝, 20 November 1604 – 9 October 1693) was a Japanese Shingon monk active in the early Edo period. He was born into the Fujiwara clan, and he may have been originally from Osaka. His art name was Hakunyo (泊如), and his courtesy name was Genshun (元春).

Life 
He was born on 20 November 1614 (the nineteenth day of the tenth month of Keichō 19 according to the Japanese calendar). He is said to have been from Osaka. He was born into the Fujiwara clan. When was thirteen (according to Japanese reckoning) he joined a Buddhist temple, and became a monk at sixteen.

He was a diligent student, and was said to have learning well beyond his years. He lectured the lord of Owari Domain on the Buddhist sutras and earned his respect and admiration. At 39, he returned to the Chishaku-in in Kyoto. At 41, he was dispatched to Enpuku-ji, the Chishaku-in's  in Edo. In 1661, he became the seventh abbot of Chishaku-in, a position he held for twenty years. In 1682 (Tenna 2), he retired to Rakuhoku Zuiō-san Yōmei-bō (洛北瑞応山養命坊).

He died on 9 October 1693 (the tenth day of the ninth month of Genroku 6).

Names 
His secular family name was Fujiwara. His art name was Hakunyo, and his courtesy name was Genshun.

Writings 
In 1639 (Kan'ei 16), when he was in his mid-twenties, he published a afterword to Bunsei's (文性) Hannya Shingyō Hiken Bunrin (般若心経秘鍵文林, a commentary on the Heart Sutra). From then on, he self-published an immense volume of his own writings. During his time at Enpuku-ji, he devoted much of his scholarly energy to commentary on Kūkai's Sangō Shiiki.

References

Works cited 
 
 
 

Japanese monks
Japanese writers of the Edo period
1604 births
1693 deaths